Gaily may refer to:
 Gaily (horse), a racehorse
 Gaily Dube (born 1969), Zimbabwean sprinter
 14092 Gaily, a minor planet